The 2008 Meteor Music Awards ceremony was held in the RDS, Dublin, on Friday, 15 February 2008. Nineteen awards were presented. It was the eighth edition of the Republic of Ireland's national music awards. The event was later broadcast on RTÉ Two on Saturday, 16 February at 21:00. The comedian Dara Ó Briain hosted the awards for the first time since 2004 Duke Special and Cathy Davey won the Best Irish Male and Best Irish Female Awards respectively, whilst veteran rockers Aslan won the Best Irish Band Award and Paddy Casey's Addicted to Company won Best Irish Album. For the eighth consecutive year Westlife won the Best Irish Pop Act accolade. Ham Sandwich were presented with the Hope for 2008 Meteor Award by RTÉ 2fm DJ Rick O'Shea. The Blizzards won Best Irish Live Performance for their Main Stage appearance at Oxegen 2007, whilst Muse picked up the award for Best International Live Performance, which also occurred at Oxegen the previous year. The award for the Most Downloaded Song was given to Mundy and Sharon Shannon's chart hit "Galway Girl". The Saw Doctors were presented with a Lifetime Achievement Award and were also amongst the performers at the event.

Performances 
There were performances at the event from The Saw Doctors, Boyzone, The Coronas, Cathy Davey, Westlife, Shayne Ward, Tom Baxter, Paddy Casey and Scouting for Girls, as well as exclusive duets between Sinéad O'Connor and Mick Pyro of Republic of Loose, who performed the Curtis Mayfield song, "We People Who Are Darker Than Blue" and Gary Lightbody and Lisa Hannigan who performed, live for the first time, "Some Surprise" from The Cake Sale charity album.

Nominations

Public voting categories

Best Irish Male 
Paddy Casey
Damien Dempsey
Duke Special
Glen Hansard
David Geraghty
Declan O'Rourke

Best Irish Female 
Andrea Corr
Cathy Davey
Maria Doyle Kennedy
Róisín Murphy
Sinéad O'Connor
Dolores O'Riordan

Best Irish Band 
Ash
Aslan
Fight Like Apes
Delorentos
The Flaws
Future Kings of Spain

Best Irish Album 
Addicted to Company
Tales of Silversleeve
In Love with Detail
Achieving Vagueness
Nervousystem
Kill Your Darlings

Best Irish Live Performance 
Bell X1 – Malahide Castle
The Blizzards – Oxegen 2007
Duke Special – Vicar Street
Fight Like Apes – Whelan's
Future Kings of Spain – The Village
Damien Rice – Marlay Park

Best Irish Pop Act 
Bell X1
The Blizzards
The Coronas
Brian McFadden
Róisín Murphy
Westlife

Best National DJ 
Ray D'Arcy – Today FM
Ian Dempsey – Today FM
Tom Dunne – Today FM
Dave Fanning – RTÉ 2fm
Ray Foley – Today FM
Rick O'Shea – RTÉ 2fm

Best Regional DJ 
Pete Casey
Keith Cunningham
Leigh Doyle
Joe & Keith
Mark Noble
Jon Richards

Hope for 2008 
Leanne Harte
Owen Brady
The Kinetiks
We Should Be Dead
Ham Sandwich

Non-public voting categories

Best Traditional/Folk 
Damien Dempsey
Tommy Fleming
Kíla
Moving Hearts
Majella Murphy
Sharon Shannon

Best International Male 
Richard Hawley
Bruce Springsteen
Timbaland
Justin Timberlake
Rufus Wainwright
Kanye West

Best International Female 
Björk
PJ Harvey
Kylie Minogue
Kate Nash
Rihanna
Amy Winehouse

Best International Band 
Arcade Fire
The Killers
Kings of Leon
Radiohead
The Shins
Take That

Best International Album 
Neon Bible
Boxer
White Chalk
Sound of Silver
Raising Sand
In Rainbows

Best International Live Performance 
Arcade Fire – Olympia Theatre
Björk – Electric Picnic 07
Muse – Oxegen 2007
The Police – Croke Park
Bruce Springsteen – The Point
Justin Timberlake – RDS Arena

Lifetime Achievement Award 
 The Saw Doctors

Most Downloaded Song 
 "Galway Girl" – Mundy and Sharon Shannon

References

External links
 Official site
 MCD Promotions
 List of winners through the years
 List of 2008 nominations at Phantom FM

Meteor Music Awards
Meteor Awards